Garrick Hagon (born September 27, 1939) is a British-Canadian actor in film, stage, television and radio, known for his role as Biggs Darklighter in Star Wars: A New Hope. His many films include Batman, Spy Game, Me and Orson Welles and The Message. He was the rebel leader Ky in the Doctor Who serial The Mutants, and played Simon Gerrard, Debbie Aldridge's husband in the BBC's The Archers.

Early life and career
Hagon was born in London, England, and brought up in Toronto, Ontario, Canada, where he attended UTS and Trinity College (Hon. English, 1963). He acted with Alec Guinness in Richard III at the Stratford Festival, where he played for seven seasons and won the Tyrone Guthrie Award in 1963. He guest-starred (as Johnnie Nipick) in the episode The River in the CBC television series The Forest Rangers in 1964. After studying for a spell with the Royal Court Theatre Studio in London, Hagon then acted with Prospect Productions, in many repertory theatres, in the West End in Arthur Miller’s All My Sons (as Chris Kellar) and at the Royal National Theatre in After The Fall.

As a voice actor he has been heard in many films and TV series, including the UK dub of Star Fleet/X-Bomber (as Capt. Carter), the Manga titles, The Secret of Mamo and Goodbye Lady Liberty and Akira Kurosawa's Ran. His voice is featured in the video game, Divinity II: Ego Draconis and he has recorded over 150 audiobooks for major UK publishers. Hagon has also directed over 100 audiobook recordings, including Michelle Paver's Wolf Brother read by Ian McKellen, and the Audie Award-winning, full-cast, unabridged His Dark Materials by Philip Pullman.

In the original version of Star Wars: A New Hope, Hagon's role as Biggs Darklighter, Red 3, came to an early but heroic end in the attack on the Death Star in the film's climactic battle scene. In the 2011 Blu-ray release of the Star Wars films, Biggs's establishing scene at Anchorhead on Tatooine can be seen in full along with the characters of Fixer and Camie, played by Anthony Forrest and Koo Stark, respectively. Because of his performance as Biggs, Hagon has been invited to several sci-fi conventions and inducted into "Rebel Legions" and "501st Garrisons" - two Star Wars fandom groups - around the world.

Hagon's many films include: Dad in Tim Burton's Batman, Ammar in Moustapha Akkad's The Message, CIA Director Wilson in Tony Scott's Spy Game, Dr. Mewling in Richard Linklater's Me and Orson Welles, Fr. Loughton in Xie Jin's The Opium War, Lt. Rafferty in Richard Attenborough's A Bridge Too Far, the British General in Paul Verhoeven's Black Book, Eros in Charlton Heston's Antony and Cleopatra, Jack Ives in Michael Pressman's Some Kind of Hero, and the American doctor in Olivier Dahan's La Vie en rose. In 2006, he appeared in an episode of The Line of Beauty.

In 2012, Hagon appeared in Doctor Who series 7 episode 3, "A Town Called Mercy". Filming took place in Almeria, Spain, March 2012. He also appeared in the video game Batman: Arkham Knight as Henry Adams.

Filmography

Film

Television

Video game

Theatre credits

See also
 Rex Hagon, brother

References

External links
Official Website

Hagon's Official "Biggs Darklighter" Website
The Story Circle, Hagon's production and creative audio recording company

1939 births
Living people
Male actors from London
Canadian expatriates in England
English male film actors
English male stage actors
English male television actors
English emigrants to Canada
Canadian male film actors
Canadian male television actors
Canadian male voice actors